Libber may refer to:

 A liberationist
 Tony Liberatore, Australian rules footballer

See also 
 Liber, in ancient Roman mythology, a god of viticulture and wine, fertility and freedom
 Liberal (disambiguation)
 Libra (disambiguation)